Chiles en nogada is a Mexican dish of poblano chiles stuffed with picadillo (a mixture usually containing shredded meat, aromatics, fruits and spices) topped with a walnut-based cream sauce called nogada, pomegranate seeds and parsley, and it is typically served at room temperature. It is widely considered a national dish of Mexico.

The picadillo usually contains panochera apple (manzana panochera), sweet-milk pear (pera de leche) and criollo peach (durazno criollo). The cream sauce usually has milk, double cream, fresh cheese, sherry and walnut. The walnuts, which give the nogada sauce its name (nogal being Spanish for "walnut tree") are traditionally of the cultivar nogal de Castilla (Castilian walnut). In some cases, pecans may substitute for or supplement the walnuts.

The traditional season for making and eating this dish in Central Mexico is August and the first half of September, when pomegranates appear in the markets of the region and the national independence festivities begin. The coloration of the dish—green chile, white sauce, red pomegranate—further the patriotic associations, as these are the main colors of the flag of Mexico.

The traditional chile en nogada is from Puebla; it is tied to the Mexican independence since it is said they were prepared for the first time to entertain the future emperor Agustín de Iturbide when he came to the city after the signing of the Treaty of Córdoba. This dish is a source of pride for the inhabitants of the state of Puebla. 

Some Mexican historians believe the inventors of this dish were the Monjas Clarisas, although others think they were the Madres Contemplativas Agustinas of the convent of Santa Mónica, Puebla.

References

See also
 Chile relleno
 Stuffed peppers

Meat dishes
Mexican cuisine
Stuffed vegetable dishes
Walnut dishes